Justin Fleming may refer to:

 Justin Fleming (author) (born 1953), Australian playwright and author
 Justin C. Fleming, (born 1980), member of the Pennsylvania House of Representatives